The incense offering in Judaism was related to perfumed offerings on the altar of incense in the time of the Tabernacle and the First and Second Temple period, and was an important component of priestly liturgy in the Temple in Jerusalem.

In the Hebrew Bible
The sacred incense prescribed for use in the wilderness Tabernacle was made of costly materials that the congregation contributed. The Book of Exodus describes the recipe:

At the end of the Holy compartment of the tabernacle, next to the curtain dividing it off from the Most Holy, was located the incense altar. According to the Books of Chronicles, there was also a similar incense altar in Solomon's temple in Jerusalem. Every morning and evening the sacred incense was burned. Once a year, on the Day of Atonement, coals from the altar were taken in a censer, or fire holder, together with two handfuls of incense, into the Holy of Holies, where the incense was made to smoke before the mercy seat of the ark of the testimony (Leviticus ).

The Book of Exodus lists four components of the incense, while the Talmud lists seven additional components from the oral Torah. The four components from the Book of Exodus are
stacte (נָטָף naṭaf)
onycha (שְׁחֵלֶת sheħeleth)
galbanum (חֶלְבְּנָה ħelbbinah)
pure frankincense (לְבוֹנָה זָךְ levonah zakh)
The components are still being studied and are not determined with absolute certainty. Stacte is variously described as being the extract of the transparent portion of the myrrh resin which exudes spontaneously from the tree, or a balsam from a tree such as opobalsamum or a styrax. Onycha, which in Greek means "nail", is variously described as being the operculum from a shell found in the Red Sea (which are said to resemble a fingernail), the exudation from the rock rose bush called labdanum (both petals and markings which are said to resemble a fingernail), Styrax benzoin, bdellium, or even cloves. Galbanum is generally considered to be Ferula galbaniflua. Also considered is a milder variety from the Levant or possibly even a close relative of Ferula galbaniflua called narthex or giant fennel. Pure frankincense is the resin of a tree of the boswellia species.

In Hellenistic Judaism
Josephus mentions the incense, numbering thirteen ingredients.

In rabbinic literature 

The rabbis of the Talmud expanded the description of the recipe for the incenses from 4 ingredients of the Hebrew Bible to 11 ingredients. as follows:

According to the Talmud, the House of Avtinas was responsible for compounding the qetoret incense in the days of the Second Temple.

In Christianity
The New Testament makes several typological references to incense, including a Christological reference to the coals from the altar of incense taken behind the veil on the Day of Atonement, and a reference to the prayers of believers as incense. In later Christian typology the smoke of incense in the tabernacle typically signifies offered prayer. This was developed in medieval Christian art. In the Catholic Church, the Eastern Orthodox Church and a considerable part of the Anglican Church, and among some Lutheran churches as well, incense is still used in liturgical rites as well as in some popular devotions outside of church liturgies.

See also
 Incense offering in rabbinic literature
 Kyphi, incense used in ancient Egypt
 Riha (Mandaeism), incense used for religious rituals

References
 Arnold Lustiger and Michael Taubes (2006). Yom Kippur Machzor: With Commentary Adapted From the Teachings of Rabbi Joseph B. Soloveitchik, the Kashirer Edition, K'hal Publishing.
 Incense, Jewish Encyclopedia (1906)

Jewish sacrificial law
Incense
Tabernacle and Temples in Jerusalem
Book of Exodus